Abbas Qarib (Persian: عباس قریب) born 1916 in Tehran, Iran and died on September 16, 2009 was  the last surviving member of Iran's first national football team.

In 1941, he played as a left wing defender in games against Afghanistan and British Raj (India). In 1942, he played in a friendly in Tehran versus a British Army XI.

He was a clerk employed by Bank Melli and played for Bank Melli F.C. and Daraei F.C. in the 1940s.

He died following weeks of hospitalization for a broken pelvis.

References

1916 births
2009 deaths
Iran international footballers
Iranian footballers
People from Tehran
Association football defenders